Pearson Metropark is a regional park in Oregon, Ohio, owned and managed by Metroparks Toledo. It is one of the few remnants left of the Great Black Swamp. The park contains old-growth forest and wetlands. The park contains a pond with paddle boat rentals in the summer months and sledding in the winter months.

Pearson Metropark hosts an annual waterfowl festival.

References

External links
Metroparks Toledo
Park Map

Protected areas of Lucas County, Ohio
Parks in Ohio
Works Progress Administration in Toledo, Ohio
Civilian Conservation Corps in Ohio
Metroparks Toledo